United Nations Security Council resolution 466, adopted unanimously on 11 April 1980, after hearing representations from Zambia and recalling 455 (1979), the council condemned the continued and unprovoked attacks on Zambia by South Africa.

The council continued to demand the withdrawal of South African forces from Zambian territory and warns that the council will take further action, including under Chapter VII, if this is not met. It also commended Zambia for its restraint during the attacks.

See also
 List of United Nations Security Council Resolutions 401 to 500 (1976–1982)
 South African Border War
 South Africa under apartheid

References
Text of the Resolution at undocs.org

External links
 

 0466
20th century in South Africa
1980 in South Africa
 0466
April 1980 events
South Africa–Zambia relations